A diaulos (from Gr. δι-, double, and αὐλός, pipe), in ancient Greek architecture, was a peristyle round the great court of the palaestra, described by Vitruvius, which measured two stadia (.) in length, on the south side this peristyle had two rows of columns, so that in stormy weather the rain might not be driven into the inner part.

Vitruvius says that the diaulos should contain "spacious exedrae… with seats, so that philosophers, orators, and everyone else who delights in study will be able to sit and hold discussions." The double (south) portico should contain a large exedra, on one side a punching bag, a dust bath, and a cold water sink (loutron), on the other side an oiling room, a cold bath (frigidarium), and a passage to the stream room, sauna, and hot-water washing area.

See also
 Glossary of architecture
 Palaestra at Delphi
 Palaestra at Olympia

Notes

References

Attribution:
 

Ancient Greek architecture
Columns and entablature